Elizabeth May Jameson (May 9, 1919 – February 7, 2009) was an American professional golfer. She was one of the thirteen founders of the Ladies Professional Golf Association (LPGA) in 1950. She won three major championships and a total of thirteen events during her career, one as amateur and twelve as a professional. She is a member of the World Golf Hall of Fame.

Amateur career
Jameson was born in Norman, Oklahoma and graduated from Dallas' Sunset High School in 1939. She started playing golf at age 11. According to her obituary in the New York Times, her mother gave her 50 cents for a greens fee and another 50 cents to rent a set of clubs at a public golf course in Dallas when she was 11 years old. She won the 1932 Texas Publinx title at the age of 13 and the Southern Championship when she was 15. She won the U.S. Women's Amateur in 1939 and 1940. She won the Women's Western Amateur in 1940 and 1942. In 1942, she also won the Women's Western Open, a major at the time, while still an amateur. She was selected to the DISD Athletics Hall of Fame and is a Member of the Sunset High School Hall of Fame.

Professional career
Jameson turned professional in 1945. She was one of the thirteen women who founded the LPGA in 1950. She won a total of thirteen events, including three major championships. In 1947, she won the U.S. Women's Open with a 295 total at the Starmount Forest Country Club in Greensboro, North Carolina, marking the first time a female golfer scored lower than 300 in a 72-hole tournament. She won the 1954 Women's Western Open again. In 1967, when the LPGA Tour Hall of Fame was created, Jameson was one of the six inaugural inductees. The LPGA recognized her induction year into the Hall of Fame of Women's Golf, 1951, as her official induction year into the LPGA Tour Hall of Fame and the World Golf Hall of Fame. She competed in her final LPGA event, the Burdine's Invitational, in 1970.

Jameson conceived the idea of annually honoring the golfer with the lowest scoring average on the LPGA Tour and, in 1952, donated a trophy for that in the name of Glenna Collett Vare. She was inducted into the Women's Sports Foundation's Hall of Fame in 1999, and was listed as "...as one of the (LPGA) association’s top 50 players and teachers."  In 2004, August 14 was proclaimed "Betty Jameson Day" in Delray Beach, Florida, to commemorate her career accomplishments.

Jameson had to stop playing golf, other than doing some occasional chipping and putting, because of pain in her wrists caused by carpal tunnel syndrome. She took up painting for her own enjoyment and sold a few works to friends. However, according to her obituary in the New York Times, she was reportedly destitute when she died at her home, which was then in Boynton Beach, Florida.

Professional wins

LPGA Tour wins (13)
1942 (1) Women's Western Open (as an amateur)
1947 (2) U.S. Women's Open, Women's Texas Open
1948 (1) Tampa Open
1952 (3) Corpus Christi Tournament, Bakersfield Open (tie with Marlene Hagge, Betsy Rawls, and Babe Zaharias), World Championship
1953 (1) Serbin Miami Beach Open
1954 (1) Women's Western Open
1955 (4) Sarasota Open, Babe Zaharias Open, White Mountain Open, Richmond Open

Other wins (5)
1938 Women's Texas Open (as an amateur)
1946 Hardscrabble Open
1952 Hardscrabble Open
1955 Virginia Hot Springs 4-Ball (with Mary Lena Faulk)
1958 Homestead 4-Ball (with Mary Lena Faulk)

Major championships

Wins (3)

See also
List of golfers with most LPGA Tour wins

References

External links

Betty Jameson bio at golfcompendium.com

American female golfers
LPGA Tour golfers
Winners of ladies' major amateur golf championships
Winners of LPGA major golf championships
World Golf Hall of Fame inductees
Golfers from Oklahoma
Golfers from Florida
University of Texas at Austin alumni
Sportspeople from Norman, Oklahoma
Sportspeople from Boynton Beach, Florida
1919 births
2009 deaths
20th-century American women
20th-century American people
21st-century American women